My Dear Marthandan is a 1990 Indian Tamil-language film directed by Pratap Pothen and produced by Sivaji Productions, starring Prabhu and Khushbu. It is loosely based on the 1988 American film Coming to America. The film was released on 24 August 1990.

Plot 

Marthandan lives with his parents in a palace. He sets out to Chennai to find a girl. There he meets "Idea Mani", who is very cunning and tries to make money from the innocent Marthandan in comical ways. He meets a girl named Rani in a bakery and befriends her. The rest of the story is about how he tries to win her over and how he understands the value of money.

Cast

Soundtrack 
The soundtrack was composed by Ilaiyaraaja.

Release and reception 
My Dear Marthandan was released on 24 August 1990. N. Krishnaswamy of The Indian Express wrote, "It has some idealism (message: money cannot buy happiness), it has comical situations abounding and as it is, it is clean, it has engaging music and songs (Ilayaraja) and dance, and it is photographed with an artistry and creativity that only an Ashok Kumar is capable of. It is a technically perfect film that way". Ravi, writing for Kalki, said the film's plus points were the cinematography and music.

References

External links 
 

1990 films
1990s Tamil-language films
Films directed by Pratap Pothen
Films scored by Ilaiyaraaja
Indian remakes of American films